Spørring is a town in Aarhus Municipality, Central Denmark Region in Denmark with a population of 1,052 (1 January 2022). Spørring is situated in the northern section of Aarhus Municipality between the city of Aarhus and Randers in Spørring Parish close to Trige and Ølsted.

References

External links 

 Spørring Website

Towns and settlements in Aarhus Municipality
Cities and towns in Aarhus Municipality